Circulus are a psychedelic folk/progressive rock band from South London, England, founded by vocalist Michael Tyack.

The band uses a mix of modern and medieval instruments, such as the lute, cittern, crumhorn and rauschpfeife, along with the Moog synthesizer, bass and electric guitars. Tyack claims to believe in fairies and pixies, and they have been known to play their live shows with the audience sitting on the floor.

Circulus were featured in a two-page spread of an NME issue in 2005, and a two-page interview in Terrorizer in 2006 . Their album Clocks are Like People was reviewed in Metal Hammer magazine in September 2006, receiving 8/10.

The band featured in an SVT (Swedish) music television documentary called This Is Our Music in 2005, and were interviewed on BBC2's The Culture Show on 3 February 2007 as part of an item on the 'new folk'.

Mojo magazine chose Circulus to cover "Lucy in the Sky with Diamonds" for their 40th anniversary Sgt. Pepper's Lonely Hearts Club Band tribute album, Sgt. Pepper...With a Little Help from His Friends, given away with their March 2007 issue.

In 2018 Michael Tyack confirmed a new album to be released in the summer of 2018.

Discography
EPs
 Giantism (1999, Instant Farma)

Albums
 The Lick on the Tip of an Envelope Yet to Be Sent (2005, Rise Above Records)
 Clocks Are Like People (2006, Rise Above Records)
 Thought Becomes Reality (2009, Mythical Cake)
 Birth (2018, Mythical Cake)
 Gate 47 (2018, Mythical Cake)
 Live at Dingwalls 2005 (2019, Mythical Cake)

Singles
 "Everyone" / "Ring o' Roses" / "Gently Johnny Pt 1" (1997, Instant Farma)
 "Little More Time" / "Happen Away" (1998, Instant Farma)
 "Wouldn't Dream of Sleeping Now" / "Same Way From the Sun" (2000, Instant Farma)
 "Swallow" / "My Body is Made of Sunlight" / "La Rotta°" (2005, Rise Above Records))
 "Song of Our Despair" / "Honeycomb" / "Tapestry°" (2006, Rise Above Records)

(° on CD version only)

Other releases
 Music Plays in the Air (on Get Yer Pots Out with the fanzine Ptolemaic Terrascope, 2001)
 Split 7" – Miri It Is (Moog-up Mix) by Circulus / Chylde of Fire by Witchcraft (2005, Rise Above Records)
 La Rotta (2005) (on The Crow Club compilation, 2008 People Tree Records)
 Lucy in the Sky With Diamonds (Mojo Presents Sgt. Pepper... With A Little Help From My Friends, 2007, Mojo Magazine)
 The Unquiet Grave (on Old Wine, New Skins compilation, 2007, Market Square Music)
 Till We Merry Meet Again (on A Psychedelic Guide to Monsterism Island compilation, 2009, Lo Recordings)

Releases with Circulus members
 Lo Polidoro – Lo Polidoro (2005)
 Lo Polidoro – Le Carrousel Des Jours (2009, Marboz Records)
 Marianne Segal – The Gathering (2007, Snow Beach Records) produced by Michael Tyack and featuring Circulus
 Thistletown – Rosemarie (2008, Big Bertha Records) produced by Michael Tyack

Band members

Current members
Michael Tyack – vocals, guitars, saz, cittern

Former members
Lo Polidoro – vocals
Will Summers – flute, recorder, crumhorn, shawm
Sam Kelly – drums, vocals
George Parfitt – bass guitar
Oliver Parfitt  – keyboards, synthesizers
Victor Hugo Llamas – bongos, percussion
Nick Baxter – percussion
Nigel Hoyle – bass, vocals
Eric Anholm – guitar, vocals
Jason Hobart – bass, vocals
Emma Steele – vocals, flute
Robin Cieslak – guitar, vocals, percussion
Damien Cavanagh – drums
Jenny Bliss Bennett – violin, viola da gamba, flute, vocals
Cathy Harabaras – drums, backing vocals

 Mythical Cake label 
In 2008, the band started its own record label, Mythical Cake, using donations solicited from fans and the public at large. A donation of 50 British pounds or more secured a photograph in the Thought Becomes Reality'' album liner notes. This alternative appeal is part of a growing trend of bands attempting to create a distribution infrastructure outside the traditional music industry.

References

External links
 Circulus official website
 Circulus on MySpace
 
 

Medieval folk rock groups
English progressive rock groups